William Draper may refer to:

Business
 William B. Draper (1804–1885), importer and president of the Flushing National Bank
 William Henry Draper Jr. (1894–1974), U.S. army officer, banker, and diplomat
 William Henry Draper III (born 1928), American businessman, son of William Henry Draper Jr

Politics
 William Draper (MP) (1620–?), English politician
 William Henry Draper (1801–1877), lawyer, judge and political figure in Upper Canada and Canada West
 William Henry Draper (congressman) (1841–1921), U.S. Representative from New York
 William Franklin Draper (politician) (1842–1910), U.S. Representative from Massachusetts
 William G. Draper (1920–1964), U.S. Air Force officer and aide to President Dwight D. Eisenhower

Other
 William Draper (British Army officer) (1721–1787), British lieutenant-general
 William Draper (cricketer) (1848–1919), English cricket player and umpire
 William Henry Draper (hymnwriter) (1855–1933), British clergyman, noted for "All Creatures of Our God and King"
 William Franklin Draper (artist) (1912–2003), American painter
William Draper III, first Mormon bishop of Draper, Utah, after whom the town was named

See also
William Draper Best, 1st Baron Wynford, British politician and judge
William Draper Harkins (1873–1951), American chemist
William Draper Lewis (1867–1949), founder of the American Law Institute
William Henry Draper (disambiguation)